Newton is a hamlet and civil parish in the Rushcliffe district, in the county of Nottinghamshire, England.

RAF Newton is a disused airfield immediately to the south of Main Street. It opened in July 1940 and closed in 2000. The hangars and other buildings are now used by a number of businesses within the Newton Commercial Centre.

Newton Mill was a wooden post mill built before 1855. It ceased work c. 1920 and the buck was dismantled c. 1952. Some parts, including a stone neck bearing, were donated to the Science Museum in London. The brick roundhouse now belongs to the Crown.

References

External links

Hamlets in Nottinghamshire
Civil parishes in Nottinghamshire
Rushcliffe